Anup Kumar Yama (born 1 September 1984) is an Indian roller skater. He won the Arjuna Award in 2015 by Indian Government (for outstanding achievement in National Sports). He has won several national titles.

He won two bronze medals at the 2010 Asian Games held in Guangzhou, China in the Men's Single Free Skating and Pairs Skating events with his partner Avani Panchal.

Early life
He was born on 1 September 1984 in a family of athletes.

Anup started skating at four. He is coached by his father Veeresh Yama, also a skater.

Career 
He is a second-generation performer. He is ranked first in the world in the 'Inline Artistic Roller Skating' category in 58th World Artistic Roller Skating Championship in Taiwan.

After winning the bronze medal in the 57th World Artistic Roller Skating Championship 2012, which was held in New Zealand, he headed straight to the 15th Asian Roller Skating Championship in Hefei, China. It was held from 23 to 31 October. He won three gold medals and two silver medals. This achievement surpassed his previous Asian Championship achievement of three gold medals and two bronze medals, which was the highest number of medals ever won by a single skater in the Asian Championship Artistic Skating event. He is the record-holder for most medals ever won by an artistic skater in Asia at a single Asian Championship.

Yama's medals at the 15th Asian Roller Skating Championship:
 One gold medal in Senior Men's Freestyle Quad Artistic Skating
 One gold medal in Senior Men's Figure Artistic Skating
 One gold medal in Senior Men's Combined Artistic Skating
 One silver medal in Men's Inline Figure Artistic Skating
 One silver medal in Men's Solo Dance Artistic Skating
He is the only Indian to win:

 80 gold medals at the district level 
 80 gold medals at the national level 
 Eight gold medals, five silver medals and nine bronze medals at the Asian level 
 One bronze medal and one gold medal at the world level

He is the only skater in India to participate in more than 10 World Championships and uniquely is ranked first in India, first in Asia and first in the entire world.

Achievements

Achievements at the National Level

	1 gold medal in Freestyle Artistic Skating at the All India National Competition, Bangalore, 1989.
	2 gold medals in Freestyle and Pair Artistic Skating at the National Championship, Patiala-Punjab, 1991.
	3 gold medals in Freestyle, Figure and Pair Artistic Skating at the National Championship, Patiala-Punjab, 1992.
	3 gold medals in Freestyle, Figure and Pair Artistic Skating at the National Championship, Trivendrum-Kerala, 1993.
	3 gold medals in Freestyle, Figure and Pair Artistic Skating at the National Championship, Patiala-Punjab, 1994.
	1 gold medal, 1 silver medal and 1 bronze medal at the National Championship, Kolkata, 1995.
	1 gold medal in Freestyle Artistic Skating at the National Championship, Patiala-Punjab, 1996.
	1 silver medal in Freestyle Artistic at the National Championship, Pune, 1997.
	1 gold medal in Freestyle Artistic at the National Championship, Visakhapatnam, 1998.
	1 gold medal in Freestyle and Figure Artistic Championship respectively at the National Championship, Faridabad, 2000.
	2 gold medals for Freestyle and Figure Artistic Championship at the National Championship, Visakhapatnam, 2001.
	2 gold medals for Freestyle and Figure Artistic Championship at the National Championship, Visakhapatnam, 2002.
	2 gold medals for Freestyle and Figure and a silver medal in pair skating at the NATIONAL GAMES, 2002.
	3 gold medals for Freestyle, Figure and Pair Artistic Skating at the National Championship, Faridabad, 2004.
	2 gold medals for Freestyle and Figure Artistic Skating at the National Championship, Kolkata, 2005.
	3 gold medals for Freestyle, Figure and Pair Artistic Skating at the National Championship, Visakhapatnam, 2006.
	4 gold medals for Freestyle, Figure, Pair and Solo Dance Artistic Skating at the National Championship, Visakhapatnam, 2008.
	5 gold medals for Freestyle, Figure, Pair, Solo Dance and Inline Artistic Skating at the National Championship, Visakhapatnam, 2009.
	6 gold medals for Freestyle, Figure, Pair, Combined, Solo Dance and Inline Artistic Skating at the National Championship, Visakhapatnam, 2010.
	7 gold medals for Freestyle, Figure, Pair, Combined, Solo Dance, Pair dance and Inline Artistic Skating at the National Championship, 2011.
	8 gold medals for Freestyle, Figure, Pair, Combined, Solo Dance, Pair dance, Show Group and Inline Artistic Skating at the National Championship, 2012.
     7 gold medals for Freestyle, Figure, Pair, Combined, Solo Dance, Pair dance, and Inline Artistic Skating at the National Championship, 2013.

Achievements at the Asian Level

	Participated in the 8th Asian Roller Skating Championship, 1999. (Jinshan - China)
	1 bronze medal in Freestyle Artistic Skating at the 9th Asian Roller Skating Championship, 2001. (Taitung -Taiwan)
	2 bronze medals for Combined and Pair Artistic Skating at the 10th Asian Roller Skating Championship, 2004. (Akita - Japan)
	2 bronze medals in Figure and Pair Skating and a silver medal in Combined Artistic Skating at the 11th Asian Roller Skating Championship, 2005. (Jeonju - Korea)
	1 gold medal in Pair Skating, 1 silver in Combined and 1 bronze in Freestyle Artistic Skating at the 12th Asian Roller Skating Championship, 2006. (Kaohsiung -Taiwan)
	3 gold medals in Quad Freestyle, Inline Freestyle and Combined and 2 bronze medals in Figure and Pair Dance Skating at the 13th Asian Roller Skating Championship, 2008. (Haining -China)
	1 gold medal in Inline Artistic Skating, 1 silver in Combined and bronze in Pair Artistic Skating at the 14th Asian Roller Skating Championship, 2010. (Kaohsiung -Taiwan)
	2 bronze medals at the 2010 Asian Games. (Guangzhou - China)
	3 gold medals in Quad Freestyle, Figure and Combined and 2 silver medals in Inline Freestyle and Solo dance at the 15th Asian Roller Skating Championship, 2012 (Hefei-China)

Achievement at the World Level

        1 bronze medal in 2012 Inline Artistic Roller Skating World Championship at New Zealand

References

Living people
Indian roller skaters
Indian male single skaters
Indian male ice dancers
1984 births
Asian Games medalists in roller sports
Roller skaters at the 2010 Asian Games
Asian Games bronze medalists for India
Medalists at the 2010 Asian Games
Figure skaters at the 2017 Asian Winter Games
Recipients of the Arjuna Award